The Evia barbel or petropsaro (Barbus euboicus), is a species of freshwater fish in the  family Cyprinidae found only in Greece. It is endemic to the Euboea Island and there now restricted to a single stream, Manikiotikos, in the southern part of the island. During the dry season it may  be found just in a few intermittent pools. It is threatened by habitat loss and considered critically endangered.'

References

euboicus
Endemic fauna of Greece
Cyprinid fish of Europe
Fish described in 1950
Taxonomy articles created by Polbot
Taxa named by Alexander I. Stephanidis